is a Japanese former professional footballer who played as a forward or a midfielder. Regarded by many as one of the greatest female footballers of all time and the greatest Asian female footballer of all time, Sawa had a professional club career spanning 24 seasons, mostly with Nippon TV Beleza and INAC Kobe Leonessa. She also spent 22 years with the Japan national team, most notably captaining them to a FIFA Women's World Cup win in 2011 and an Olympic silver medal finish in 2012.

Sawa made her club debut in 1991 at the age of 12, and later went on to win five titles with Nippon TV Beleza between 1991 and 1999 before departing to the United States to play football in the Women's United Soccer Association (WUSA). She played for two WUSA clubs- the Atlanta Beat and the Denver Diamonds- before returning to the Japanese league in 2004. Sawa won another nine titles with Nippon TV Beleza in four years, but departed the club again in 2008. That year, Japan reached their first Olympic medal match at the Summer Olympics, and Sawa was Japan's top scorer of the tournament.

In 2011, Sawa captained the Japan national team at the 2011 World Cup. In Germany, Japan advanced to their first final of a major international tournament, where Sawa scored Japan’s match-tying goal in extra time, allowing Japan to win the match on penalties. She finished the tournament with the Golden Ball as the tournament's best player and the Golden Boot as the tournament's top scorer. Later in the year, Sawa was named the 2011 FIFA Women's World Player of the Year, the first Asian person regardless of gender to receive a major year-end individual award. She later captained Japan to a silver medal finish at the 2012 Summer Olympics and then retired from international football for the first time immediately after completion of the tournament.

Sawa returned to her role in the Japan national team to play in the 2015 FIFA Women's World Cup, her sixth World Cup and the final major international tournament of her career. Japan reached their second-ever Women’s World Cup final that year, and after a runner-up finish, she retired from international football for the twice and final time. At the end of the year, after winning the 2015 Empress's Cup with INAC Kobe Leonessa, she retired from football completely. She retired from club football with 11 league titles and 8 domestic cup titles in the Japanese League, and was also named to the league's Best XI for 11 seasons.

Sawa remains the leader in both caps and goals for Japan, with 205 and 83 respectively.

Early life
Sawa was born in Fuchū, Tokyo on 6 September 1978. She began playing football at the age of six. While watching her older brother train, she was invited by his coach to join the boys' team on the pitch.

Club career

NTV Beleza
In 1991, long considered Japan's finest female footballer, Sawa was promoted to Yomiuri Beleza (later NTV Beleza) from youth team by manager Kazuhiko Takemoto. She made her debut in L.League, Japan's highest domestic league, at the young age of 12. She played as forward and played 136 matches and scored 79 goals in League. She was also selected Best Eleven 5 times (1993, 1995, 1996, 1997 and 1998).

In 1999, NTV Beleza cancelled Sawa’s contract, forcing her to move abroad to the United States.

Atlanta Beat
With the birth of the Women's United Soccer Association (WUSA) in 2001, Sawa found herself playing in the highest-level professional women's league in the United States, for the Atlanta Beat. She scored the first goal in the club's history, and was a centerpiece of the Beat's three seasons in the league, helping them into the playoffs each year. Despite her diminutive stature at 5'5" (165 cm) tall and 121 lbs. (55 kg), she held her own with the mostly larger and more physical players, and was regularly among the team and league leaders in fouls taken.

Nippon TV Beleza
Following the WUSA's demise in 2003, Sawa returned to Japan, where she played with powerhouse Nippon TV Beleza. In 2004, she was named Women's Player of the Year for the Asian Football Confederation. She played the club until 2008. The club won L.League championship for four years in a row (2005–2008). She also was selected L.League MVP awards in 2006 and 2008.

Washington Freedom
On 24 September 2008, Sawa was selected by the Washington Freedom in the first round of the 2008 WPS International Draft. She was a fixture in the Freedom midfield through the league's first two seasons in 2009 and 2010.

Nippon TV Beleza and INAC Kobe Leonessa
Sawa returned to Japan temporarily at the end of the 2009 Women's Professional Soccer season, and joined Nippon TV Beleza on loan. At the end of 2010 Women's Professional Soccer season, she returned to Nippon TV Beleza.

In January 2011, Sawa moved to INAC Kobe Leonessa due to financial strain at Nippon TV Beleza, with international players; Shinobu Ohno, Yukari Kinga, and Chiaki Minamiyama. The club won the L.League championship three years in a row (2011–2013). On 16 December 2015, she announced her intent to retire at the end of the 2015 season. At the 2015 Empress's Cup, Sawa's final tournament as a player, INAC Kobe Leonessa reached the final. In the final against Albirex Niigata on 27 December, she scored the lone goal of the match in the 78th minute to secure the championship for her side.

International career

On 6 December 1993, at age 15, Sawa made her Japanese international debut, scoring four goals in her first ever match, a win against the Philippines. Sawa debuted in her first Women’s World Cup tournament in 1995, making her first start at 16 years old against Germany.

On 12 July 2003, Sawa scored the tie-winning goal against Mexico in 2003 Women’s World Cup qualification play-offs to secure Japan’s participation in the 2003 FIFA Women's World Cup. 

Sawa played in all of Japan’s matches at the 2004 Olympics, leading them to the knockout round of a major international tournament for the first time in Japan’s history.

Sawa scored a hat trick in a 2011 World Cup group stage match against Mexico, becoming the then-oldest player in World Cup history to score a hat trick. Sawa led the Japanese national team as captain to a world championship victory at the 2011 World Cup . After a 2–2 tie in front of a sellout crowd in Frankfurt, Germany (with one goal by Sawa in the 117th minute), Japan won the penalty shootout 3–1, defeating the United States to win their first ever World Cup. Sawa was awarded the Golden Boot for being the tournament's leading scorer with five goals and the Golden Ball for being the tournament's MVP.

On 9 January 2012, Sawa was awarded the FIFA Women's World Player of the Year in Zurich, Switzerland. She broke Marta’s streak of 5 consecutive FIFA Women’s World Player of the Year awards, and also became the first Asian person regardless of gender to receive a major individual year-end award.

In February of that year, Aya Miyama took over captaincy of Japan from Sawa.

At the 2012 London Olympics, Japan met the United States in the gold medal match where they were defeated 1-2. She announced her immediate retirement from international football in August 2012. In October 2012, she was shortlisted for the 2012 FIFA Women's World Player of the Year, where she finished 4th place in the voting.

Sawa returned to international competition in 2014 at the 2014 AFC Women's Asian Cup, which served as qualifiers to the 2015 FIFA Women's World Cup. Sawa scored Japan’s opening goal in the semifinal against China, helping Japan win 2-1 to send them to the final. Japan went on to win the final 1–0 against Australia, claiming their first ever Asian Cup title. 

Sawa was absent for many months after Japan’s Asian Cup win, coinciding with multiple injuries. In November 2014, Sawa was a member of the first round of inductees into the Asian Football Hall of Fame. In March 2015, Norio Sasaki left Sawa out of Japan’s squad for the 2015 Algarve Cup despite her being injury-free. Her exclusion from the Algarve Cup squad presented speculation that she would not be named to Japan’s World Cup roster, as the Algarve Cup was typically used as warm-up matches for major international competitions.

To some surprise, Sawa was called into Japan’s 2015 FIFA Women's World Cup squad after not featuring for Japan for the second half of 2014 or the early months of 2015. She did not regain her captaincy, however, which was still held by Aya Miyama. She returned to the national team from injury after a one-year absence, marking the occasion by scoring Japan’s match-winning goal in a friendly against New Zealand. On 8 June, she started Japan’s first match of the 2015 Women's World Cup, achieving her 200th cap with 57 minutes against Switzerland. Sawa and Brazil's Formiga became the first footballers to appear for a record sixth World Cup. Sawa had an off-the-bench role for the remainder of the tournament, starting just twice in seven games. Japan went on to advance to the final against the United States, where Sawa was subbed into the match in the 33rd minute after Japan had already conceded four goals. Japan went on to lose 5–2 to the U.S. in the final in what would end up being Sawa’s last ever match with the Nadeshiko.

On 16 December 2015, Sawa announced her retirement from football after the completion of the 2015 Nadeshiko League season. Sawa’s retirement was met with tributes from people across Japanese football, including coach Norio Sasaki, teammates Yuki Nagasato, Eriko Arakawa, and Azusa Iwashimizu, and male footballing compatriot Shunsuke Nakamura.

Career statistics

Club

International

Scores and results list Japan's goal tally first, score column indicates score after each Sawa goal.

Matches and goals scored at World Cup and Olympic tournaments
Sawa has competed in six FIFA Women's World Cups (Sweden 1995, USA 1999, USA 2003, China 2007, Germany 2011, and Canada 2015); she and Brazil's Formiga, who competed at the same Women's World Cups, are the only players of either sex to appear in six World Cup final tournaments. Sawa has also represented Japan in four Olympics: Atlanta 1996, Athens 2004, Beijing 2008 and London 2012. In all, she played 41 matches and scored 11 goals at those ten global tournaments. Sawa was a member of the Japanese teams that won the 2011 Women's World Cup, and were runners-up at the 2012 Summer Olympics and 2015 Women's World Cup.

Honors
Yomiuri/Nippon TV Beleza
Nadeshiko.League (8): 1991, 1992, 1993, 2005, 2006, 2007, 2008, 2010
Empress's Cup All-Japan Women's Football Tournament (7): 1993, 1997, 2004, 2005, 2007, 2008, 2009
Nadeshiko League Cup: 2007

INAC Kobe Leonessa
Nadeshiko.League: 2011, 2012, 2013
Empress's Cup All-Japan Women's Football Tournament: 2011
International Women's Club Championship: 2013
Nadeshiko League Cup: 2013

Japan
East Asian Football Championship: 2008, 2010
Asian Games Gold Medal: 2010
FIFA Women's World Cup: 2011
Olympic Silver Medal: 2012
AFC Women's Asian Cup: 2014

Individual
Nadeshiko League Best Eleven (11): 1993, 1995, 1996, 1997, 1998, 2005, 2006, 2007, 2008, 2011, 2012
AFC Women's Player of the Year: 2004, 2008
Nadeshiko League MVP: 2006, 2008
EAFF Women's Football Championship Best Player: 2008, 2010
FIFA Women's World Cup Golden Ball: 2011
FIFA Women's World Cup Golden Shoe: 2011
FIFA Women's World Cup All-Star Team: 2011
FIFA World Player of the Year: 2011
Asian Football Hall of Fame: 2014
IFFHS AFC Best Woman Player of the Decade 2011–2020
IFFHS AFC Woman Team of the Decade 2011–2020

Personal life
Sawa attended Teikyo University in 1999 until her club team- Nippon TV Beleza- ended her club contract, forcing her to drop out to go play club football in the United States.

On 11 August 2015, Sawa announced her marriage without naming her husband. The next day, when asked, she said that her husband was former Vegalta Sendai player Hiroaki Tsujikami. On 10 January 2017, it was announced that she had given birth to a baby girl.

In 2013, Sawa was made an ambassador for Japan’s bid for the 2020 Olympics, which was later chosen to be hosted in Tokyo. In 2021, she pulled out of the 2020 Summer Olympics torch relay due to a chronic inner-ear condition.

See also 
 List of FIFA Women's World Cup winning players
 List of women's footballers with 100 or more caps
 List of players who have appeared in multiple FIFA Women's World Cups

Notes

References

Match reports

External links

 
 
 
 
 
 
 
 JFA players' Information
 
 
 

1978 births
1995 FIFA Women's World Cup players
1999 FIFA Women's World Cup players
2003 FIFA Women's World Cup players
2007 FIFA Women's World Cup players
2011 FIFA Women's World Cup players
2015 FIFA Women's World Cup players
Asian Games gold medalists for Japan
Asian Games silver medalists for Japan
Asian Games bronze medalists for Japan
Asian Games medalists in football
Association football people from Tokyo Metropolis
Atlanta Beat (WUSA) players
Denver Diamonds players
Expatriate women's soccer players in the United States
FIFA Century Club
FIFA Women's World Cup-winning captains
FIFA Women's World Cup-winning players
FIFA World Player of the Year winners
Footballers at the 1994 Asian Games
Footballers at the 1996 Summer Olympics
Footballers at the 1998 Asian Games
Footballers at the 2002 Asian Games
Footballers at the 2004 Summer Olympics
Footballers at the 2006 Asian Games
Footballers at the 2008 Summer Olympics
Footballers at the 2010 Asian Games
Footballers at the 2012 Summer Olympics
INAC Kobe Leonessa players
Japanese expatriate sportspeople in the United States
Japanese women's footballers
Japan women's international footballers
Living people
Medalists at the 1994 Asian Games
Medalists at the 1998 Asian Games
Medalists at the 2002 Asian Games
Medalists at the 2006 Asian Games
Medalists at the 2010 Asian Games
Medalists at the 2012 Summer Olympics
Nadeshiko League players
Nippon TV Tokyo Verdy Beleza players
Olympic footballers of Japan
Olympic medalists in football
Olympic silver medalists for Japan
People from Fuchū, Tokyo
USL W-League (1995–2015) players
Washington Freedom players
Women's association football midfielders
Women's Professional Soccer players
Women's United Soccer Association players
Nadeshiko League MVPs